Avenue B and C or B&C Colonia is a census-designated place (CDP) and colonia in Yuma County, Arizona, United States. The population was 4,176 at the 2010 census. Area that are part of Avenue B and C were first subdivided in the 1920s and 1930s. The colonia received a sewer system in 2011. It is the fifth most populous community in Yuma County and second most populous CDP (behind Fortuna Foothills).

Demographics

Avenue B and C first appeared on the 2010 U.S. Census as a census-designated place (CDP).

At the 2020 census, Avenue B and C had a population of 4,176.  The racial and ethnic makeup of the population was 22.0% non-Hispanic white, 0.9% black or African American, 2.5% Native American, 0.3% Asian, 0.3% Pacific Islander, 0.1% non-Hispanic of some other race, 3.2% from two or more races and 74.7% Hispanic or Latino.

Notes

Census-designated places in Yuma County, Arizona